is a Japanese manga artist.  She is best known for the manga, High School Girls which was adapted to an anime called Girl's High. Her father, Yasuichi Oshima, was a successful manga artist as well.

Manga 
 High School Girls (2001–06), originally serialized in Futabasha's Weekly Manga Action magazine from 2001–04, then Comic High! from 2004–06.
 Mel Kano - Serialized in Japan by Monthly Sunday Gene-X Magazine.
 同棲レシピ (dōsei reshipi) - Serialized in Japan by Square Enix's bi-weekly Young Gangan Magazine.
 Berry Ecstasy
 Towakan
 Dousei Recipe
 Joshikousei: Girls-Live – a sequel to High School Girls

References

External links
  

1979 births
Living people
Manga artists from Tokyo
People from Tokyo
University of Tokyo alumni